Jean-Paul Pigasse (born 1939) is a Brazzaville-based French journalist and media proprietor.

Early life
Jean-Paul Pigasse was born on 26 July 1939 in Toulouse, France.

Career
Pigasse wrote under the pseudonym of 'Favilla' for Les Echos from 1978 to 1984. He is the author of five non-fiction books.

He is the owner of ADIAC, a communications firm which publishes the daily newspaper Les Dépêches de Brazzaville in the Republic of the Congo. He is friends with Congolese President Denis Sassou Nguesso.

In 2002, Tracfin realised that in 1999–2000, he had received 2.2 million Francs (around 340,000 Euros) from an offshore company called Socoil. Out of this sum, 1.2 million Francs were transferred to French businessman André Tarallo as a payback for a prior loan.

Personal life
His wife is a cousin of French businessman Alfred Sirven. He lives in Brazzaville, Congo.

Bibliography
La difficulté d'informer : vérités sur la presse économique (Paris: Alain Moreau, 1975).
Les sept portes du futur : des clés pour déchiffrer l'avenir (Paris: Albin Michel, 1981).
Le bouclier d'Europe (Paris: Robert Laffont, 1992).
La France et sa défense (with Jacques Baumel, Paris: Forgues, 1994).Congo, chronique d'une guerre annoncée : 5 juin-15 octobre 1997 (Paris: L'Harmattan, 1997).Le dossier noir de la presse française'' (Paris: Forgues, 1998).

References

1939 births
Living people
Writers from Toulouse
People from Brazzaville
French journalists
20th-century French newspaper publishers (people)
French male journalists
Pigasse family